Attack from Mars is a 1995 pinball game designed by Brian Eddy, and released by Midway (under the Bally label).

In this game, the player must fend off an alien invasion from the planet Mars by defending the world's major cities, destroying the invasion fleet, and conquering Mars itself.

Notable features on the playfield include four mechanized Martian figures and a strobe light (for Strobe Multiball).

Objectives
Six objectives must be completed in order to qualify for the Rule the Universe wizard mode, as follows:

Super Jets: Score a specified number of hits on the pop bumpers to light Super Jets (worth 3 million points per hit).
5-Way Combo: Make at least five lit shots in quick succession.
Super Jackpot: Collect five jackpots during regular multiball (three balls) to light the Super Jackpot, then collect it as it cycles through the five jackpot locations.
Martian Multiball: Hit all seven MARTIAN targets to light Martian Attack at the "Stroke of Luck" scoop. Once the mode is started, destroy four Martians (by hitting T, I, any of M-A-R, and either of A-N) before time runs out to begin Martian Multiball (two balls)
Total Annihilation: Shoot all four ramps/loops three times each. Each of the first three ramps/loops completed in this fashion will start a hurry-up countdown; the fourth immediately starts Total Annihilation Multiball (four balls), with all four shots and the lock lit for jackpots. 
Conquer Mars: Complete five attack waves to defend Earth against the Martians by repeatedly shooting the saucer at the top center of the playfield, then destroy Mars by shooting it 10 more times.

Once all six objectives are met, the player can shoot the "Stroke of Luck" scoop to begin Rule the Universe. This is a four-ball multiball, with every playfield shot and target lit for maximum scoring. If the player scores at least 5 billion points without losing every ball, the playfield briefly goes dead and a further 5 billion points are awarded before play resumes.

Game quotes
 "Nobody messes with the USA."
 "Take that, you pasta head!"
 "Sacre Bleu! The martians are destroying the Eiffel Tower!"
 "Get your hands off me! All four of them!"

Sequels
Attack From Mars was followed up with Revenge From Mars, released in 1999. It was designed by George Gomez, and it featured most of the original AFM design team. It was the first game to run on Williams' Pinball 2000 platform.  WMS Industries introduced slot machines in 2011 called Attack from Mars and Revenge from Mars.

Digital versions
Attack from Mars is available as a licensed table of Pinball FX 3 for several platforms and formerly available for The Pinball Arcade. Attack from Mars was also included in the arcade game UltraPin. Unlicensed recreations of the game are available for Visual Pinball.

Remake
In 2017, the Chicago Gaming Company released three new editions of the classic Williams title: Attack From Mars Classic, Attack From Mars Special Edition, and Attack From Mars Limited Edition. Each edition has some cosmetic differences, including different options for cabinet trim, a large color display with HD graphics, lighting effects on the speakers, and an animated topper on the backbox.

References

External links
Official Attack From Mars page

Attack From Mars promo video
YouTube - eight minutes of gameplay with Attack From Mars

1995 pinball machines
Midway pinball machines
Bally pinball machines